The fifth season of The Crown, which follows the life and reign of Queen Elizabeth II, was released by Netflix on 9 November 2022. It was the first season of the series to be released following both the death of Prince Philip, Duke of Edinburgh on 9 April 2021 and the death of Queen Elizabeth II on 8 September 2022.

Imelda Staunton stars as Elizabeth, along with main cast members Jonathan Pryce, Lesley Manville, Jonny Lee Miller, Dominic West and Elizabeth Debicki. All cast members are new to the series; this season marked The Crown'''s final wholesale recasting, following the ensembles led by Claire Foy (seasons one and two) and Olivia Colman (seasons three and four).

PremiseThe Crown traces the reign of Queen Elizabeth II from her wedding in 1947 through to the early 21st century. The fifth season focuses on the period from 1991 to 1997.

Cast

Main

 Imelda Staunton as Queen Elizabeth II
 Claire Foy as young Queen Elizabeth II
 Jonathan Pryce as Prince Philip, Duke of Edinburgh, Elizabeth's husband
 Lesley Manville as Princess Margaret, Countess of Snowdon, Elizabeth's younger sister
 Vanessa Kirby as young Princess Margaret
 Dominic West as Charles, Prince of Wales, Elizabeth and Philip's eldest child and the heir apparent
 Jonny Lee Miller as  John Major, Prime Minister 19901997
 Olivia Williams as Camilla Parker Bowles, Charles's long-time lover
 Claudia Harrison as Anne, Princess Royal, Elizabeth and Philip's second child and only daughter
 Natascha McElhone as Penny Knatchbull, Lady Romsey, wife of Lord Romsey, first cousin once removed of Prince Philip
 Marcia Warren as Queen Elizabeth The Queen Mother, King George VI's widow, Elizabeth II and Margaret's mother
 Elizabeth Debicki as Diana, Princess of Wales, Charles's wife

Featured
The following actors are credited in the opening titles of episodes in which they play a significant role:
 Salim Daw as Mohamed Al-Fayed, Dodi Fayed's father
 Amir El-Masry as young Mohamed Al-Fayed
 Khalid Abdalla as Dodi Fayed, Diana's lover
 Alex Jennings as Prince Edward, Duke of Windsor, Elizabeth's paternal uncle and former King of the United Kingdom who renounced the throne in 1936
 Adam Buchanan as young Edward, Prince of Wales
 Lia Williams as Wallis, Duchess of Windsor, Elizabeth's paternal aunt by marriage and the Duke of Windsor's American wife
 Timothy Dalton as Peter Townsend, the man Margaret once hoped to marry
 Ben Miles as young Peter Townsend
 Prasanna Puwanarajah as Martin Bashir, the journalist who conducted "An Interview with HRH The Princess of Wales"
 Bertie Carvel as Tony Blair, Prime Minister elected in 1997

Recurring

 Flora Montgomery as Norma Major, John Major's wife
 Andrew Havill as Sir Robert Fellowes, the Queen's private secretary and brother-in-law of Princess Diana
 James Murray as Prince Andrew, Duke of York, Elizabeth and Philip's third child
 Sam Woolf as Prince Edward, Elizabeth and Philip's youngest child
 Senan West as Prince William of Wales, Charles and Diana's elder son and the second-in-line for the British throne.
 Timothée Sambor as young Prince William of Wales
Humayun Saeed as Hasnat Khan, Diana's lover from 1995 to 1997
 Lydia Leonard as Cherie Blair, Tony Blair's wife
 Jude Akuwudike as Sydney Johnson, the Duke of Windsor's valet/footman
 Joshua Kekana as young Sydney Johnson
 Oliver Chris as Dr. James Colthurst, Princess Diana's close friend
 Jamie Glover as Patrick Jephson, Princess Diana's private secretary
 Alastair Mackenzie as Richard Aylard, Prince Charles's private secretary
 Phil Cumbus as Charles, Earl Spencer, Princess Diana's younger brother
 Richard Rycroft as George Carey, Archbishop of Canterbury
 Hanna Alström as Heini Wathén, Mohamed Al-Fayed's second wife
 Michael Jibson as Steve Hewlett, editor of "An Interview with HRH The Princess of Wales"

 Notable guests 

 Erin Richards as Kelly Fisher, Dodi Fayed's girlfriend prior to meeting Diana, Princess of Wales 
 Emma Laird Craig as Sarah, Duchess of York, Andrew's wife
 Will Powell as Prince Harry of Wales, Charles and Diana's younger son and the third-in-line to the British throne
 Teddy Hawley as young Prince Harry of Wales
 Chayma Abdelkarimi as Samira Khashoggi, Mohamed Al-Fayed's first wife
 Ahmed Ghozzi as Adnan Khashoggi, Samira's brother and Dodi's maternal uncle
 Abdelatif Hwidar as Ali-Ali Al-Fayed, Mohamed's father and Dodi's paternal grandfather
 Mohammed Kamel as Ali Al-Fayed, Mohamed's brother and Dodi's paternal uncle
 Moemen Hesham as young Ali Al-Fayed
 Semo Salha as Salah Al-Fayed, Mohamed's brother and Dodi's paternal uncle
 Said Chatiby as young Salah Al-Fayed
 Philippine Leroy-Beaulieu as Monique Ritz, Charles Ritz's widow
 Theo Fraser Steele as Timothy Laurence, Princess Anne's second husband
 Richard Dillane as King George V, Edward VIII and George VI's father and Elizabeth II's paternal grandfather
 Candida Benson as Queen Mary, George V's wife, Edward VIII and George VI's mother and Elizabeth II's paternal grandmother
 Daniel Flynn as Andrew Parker Bowles, Camilla's husband
 Emilia Lazenby as Laura Parker Bowles, Camilla and Andrew's daughter
 James Harper-Jones as Tom Parker Bowles, Camilla and Andrew's son
 Aleksey Diakin as Tsar Nicholas II of Russia, Emperor of Russia, George V's maternal first cousin
 Anja Antonowicz as Tsarina Alexandra Feodorovna of Russia, Empress of Russia, George V's paternal first cousin, Prince Philip's maternal great-aunt, wife of Nicholas II
 Anastasia Everall as Grand Duchess Olga Nikolaevna of Russia, Nicholas II and Alexandra's elder daughter, Edward VIII and George VI's second cousin
 Julia Haworth as Grand Duchess Tatiana Nikolaevna of Russia, Nicholas II and Alexandra's second daughter, Edward VIII and George VI's second cousin
 Tamara Sulkhanishvili as Grand Duchess Maria Nikolaevna of Russia, Nicholas II and Alexandra's third daughter, Edward VIII and George VI's second cousin
 Amy Fourman as Grand Duchess Anastasia Nikolaevna of Russia, Nicholas II and Alexandra's fourth daughter, Edward VIII and George VI's second cousin
 William Biletsky as Alexei Nikolaevich, Tsesarevich of Russia, Nicholas II and Alexandra's only son and heir, Edward VIII and George VI's second cousin
 Oleg Mirochnikov as Eugene Botkin, Court Physician to the Tsar and Tsarina of Russia
 Gediminas Adomaitis as Yakov Yurovsky, Chief Executioner of the Tsar of Russia, and his family
 Nicholas Lumley as Lord Stamfordham, private secretary to King George V, and maternal grandfather of the Queen's former private secretary Lord Adeane
 Elliot Cowan as Norton Knatchbull, Lord Romsey, grandson of Lord Mountbatten
 Edward Powell as Nicholas Knatchbull, Lord and Lady Romsey's son
 Elodie Vickers as Alexandra Knatchbull, Lord and Lady Romsey's daughter
 Clara Graham as Leonora Knatchbull, Lord and Lady Romsey's daughter
 Anatoliy Kotenyov as Boris Yeltsin, President of Russia
 Marina Shimanskaya as Naina Yeltsina, First Lady of Russia, wife of Boris Yeltsin
 Nicholas Gleaves as John Birt, Director General of the BBC
 Richard Cordery as Marmaduke "Duke" Hussey, Chairman of the Board of Governors of the BBC
 Haydn Gwynne as Lady Susan Hussey, Elizabeth II's senior lady-in-waiting
 Andrew Steele as Andrew Morton, Princess Diana's biographer
 Ben Lloyd-Hughes as Mark Bolland, public relations executive and deputy private secretary to Prince Charles
 Karine Ambrosio as Marie-Luce Townsend, Peter Townsend's wife
 Ben Warwick as Jonathan Dimbleby, the journalist who conducted "Charles: The Private Man, the Public Role"
 Martin Turner as Earl of Airlie, Lord Chamberlain and brother-in-law of Princess Alexandra, The Hon. Lady Ogilvy
 Cameron Harding as part of the Royal Navy crew of the Royal Yacht, responsible for hiding the newspapers from Her Majesty.
 Adonis Kapsalis as Captain Fletcher.

 Episodes 

Production
Casting
In January 2020, Imelda Staunton was announced as succeeding Colman as the Queen in the fifth season, and her role in the final sixth season was reported in July. Also in July 2020, Lesley Manville was announced as portraying Princess Margaret, and the following month, Jonathan Pryce and Elizabeth Debicki had been cast as Prince Philip and Diana, Princess of Wales, respectively. In October 2020, Dominic West was in talks to play Prince Charles and was officially confirmed as part of the cast in April 2021. In June 2021, Jonny Lee Miller was cast as John Major and Olivia Williams announced that she would portray Camilla Parker Bowles. On 18 November 2021, it was announced Senan West, the real-life son of Dominic, was cast as Prince William. In March 2022, Philippine Leroy-Beaulieu was cast as Monique Ritz.

Filming
Filming for the season began in July 2021. Jemima Khan, who was a friend of Princess Diana, revealed that she had stepped down as a consultant and co-writer on episodes focusing on the Princess over concerns that the story of her final years would not be properly portrayed. Filming was temporarily halted that December after eight crew members tested positive for COVID-19, which resulted in them being quarantined.

 Music 
While not on the soundtrack, "Emotions" by American singer Mariah Carey was featured in the first episode.

Release
The season was released on 9 November 2022.

 Reception 

 Audience viewership 
During its debut week, the season topped Netflix's Top ten TV English titles with 107.39 million hours viewed. The following week, it remained number one with 84.31 million viewing hours. In its third week, it ranked at number three and generated 42.36 million viewing hours.

 Critical response 
Rotten Tomatoes reported a 71% approval rating for the season based on 101 reviews, with an average rating of 6.75/10. Its critical consensus reads: "In its fifth season, it's hard to shake the feeling that this series has lost some of its luster - but addictive drama and a sterling cast remain The Crowns jewels." On Metacritic, the season holds a score of 65 out of 100 based on 37 critics, indicating "generally favorable reviews".

TVLine named Elizabeth Debicki and Dominic West the "Performers of the Week" on 19 November 2022, for their performances in the penultimate episode "Couple 31", writing: "...in one masterful scene near the end of the season's penultimate episode, the newly divorced pair met in private to share a few laughs and take a hard look what went wrong with their relationship, with Debicki and West bringing shocking candor and fresh vulnerability to the two former sweethearts. In the extended scene [...] Debicki and West [displayed] a warmth we hadn’t seen between these two since they first started dating". Meanwhile, Lesley Manville was given an honourable mention on 12 November 2022 for her performance in the episode "Annus Horribilis". The website wrote: "...Manville [brought] magnificent depth to a woman looking back on her life and wondering if things could’ve been different.”

However, many reviewers criticised the season for comparing poorly with earlier ones. Writing for The Atlantic, Shirley Li comments that "The new season of The Crown never risks challenging anyone's reputation. Instead, it merely risks its own as a compelling show". In Variety, Caroline Framke comments that "Morgan's scripts [hammer] their most obvious themes home with clattering thuds, pushing allegory after allegory with vanishingly little nuance". In The Guardian, Jack Seale concludes that "these new episodes are bitty and often just boring, with Morgan casting around for side plots to hide the fact that everything he has to say about the Windsors has already been said".

 Controversy 

After the fourth season, there were increased calls for Netflix to add a disclaimer to The Crown to emphasise that the series is a fictionalised portrayal based on historical events. These calls increased given that the fifth season was released only two months after the Queen's death. Veteran actress Judi Dench wrote an open letter to The Times'', deeming the series "crude sensationalism" and calling for a disclaimer to be added. Netflix updated both the series description and the season five trailer caption on YouTube to refer to the series as a "fictional dramatization". However, upon the release of the series, no episode contained a disclaimer.

Prime Minister John Major is depicted in one scene as discussing with Prince Charles the possibility of the Queen abdicating. Major issued a statement after the episode aired, labelling the scene as "a barrel-load of malicious nonsense", confirming that he had never discussed the series with Netflix.

Notes

References

External links
 
 

2022 American television seasons
2022 British television seasons
5